Iyeza (stylized as IYEZA) is the second solo studio album by South African record producer and musician Anatii. The album was released on 5 October 2018 by his record label YAL Entertainment.

Anatii has released three music videos for the album.

Promotion 
In promotion of his album release, Anatii commenced celebrations with an album listening session at The Vault in Marshalltown, Johannesburg. At the listening session, Anatii revealed the album’s artwork which was created by Nika Mtwana

Track listing

References 

2018 albums
Anatii albums